Ruataniwha Conservation Park is a protected area near Twizel, in the Mackenzie District and Canterbury Region of New Zealand's South Island.

The park is managed by the New Zealand Department of Conservation.

Geography

History

The park was established in 2006.

References

Forest parks of New Zealand
Parks in Canterbury, New Zealand
Mackenzie District
2006 establishments in New Zealand
Protected areas established in 2006